Colin Russell may refer to:
Colin Russell (EastEnders), character in EastEnders
Colin A. Russell (1928-2013), Emeritus Professor of History of Science and Technology at the Open University
Colin Russell (swimmer) (born 1984), Canadian swimmer
Colin Russell (footballer) (born 1961), English former footballer